The Fuchskaute is an extinct volcano and, at , the highest mountain of the Westerwald and the county of Westerwaldkreis in the German state of Rhineland-Palatinate.

The name Fuchskaute ("foxhole") refers to a place where the fox (Fuchs) had its den (Kaute).

Geography

Location 
The Fuchskaute rises in the High Westerwald, a plateau of the Westerwald which, in turn, is part of the Rhenish Massif. It is about halfway between Bad Marienberg in the west and Breitscheid in the east and lies in the parish of Willingen. The state boundary with Hesse runs along its eastern slopes and that with North Rhine-Westphalia lies a few kilometres to the north. Just under 3 km north-northeast is the tripoint of the states of Hesse, North Rhine-Westphalia and Rhineland-Palatinate. Several streams rise on its flanks, including the Nister (Große Nister).

Towers 
There used to be an observation tower on the Fuchskaute from where views of the Westerwald and other local countryside could be enjoyed.

Amateur radio services operate two transmission towers on the south top of the Fuchskaute.

See also 
List of volcanoes in Germany

References 

Mountains under 1000 metres
Volcanoes of Germany
Mountains and hills of Rhineland-Palatinate
Mountains and hills of the Westerwald